Peter Enahoro (born 21 January 1935) is a Nigerian journalist, author, businessman and publisher. Also known by the pen name of "Peter Pan" because of his popular column in New African magazine under that name. He has been described as "perhaps Africa's best known international journalist".

Early life and education 
Peter Osajele Aizegbeobor Enahoro was born on 21 January 1935 to a political family of Enahoro in Uromi, Edo State, Nigeria. His Esan parents were educator Asuelimen Okotako Enahoro and Princess Inibokun (née Okojie). His maternal grandfather was the Onogie of Uromi, Ogbidi Okojie. His eldest brother was statesman and politician, Chief Anthony Enahoro. He is one of ten siblings. He had a stint at St. Stephens Elementary School, Akure (Ondo State); CMS Primary School, Ado-Ekiti (Ondo State); Government School, Ekpoma (Edo State), St. David’s School, Akure (Ondo State), Government School, Warri (Delta State), before graduating from Government College, Ughelli (Delta State) in 1948.

Career 
Enahoro started his career in media as an Assistant Publicity Officer, Department now Federal Ministry of Information, 1954. He joined Daily Times as a sub-editor in 1955, at the age of 20, before moving on to serve as Assistant District Manager at Rediffusion Services, Ibadan, in 1957.
He became the Editor of the Nigerian Sunday Times in 1958 at the age of 23, and Features Editor of the Daily Times in 1958, then the paper's Editor in 1962, going on to become the Daily Times Group Editorial Adviser in 1965, and in 1966 Editor-in-Chief of the Daily Times.

In the 1960s, Enahoro went into a self-imposed exile that would last for 13 years. He was Contributing Editor of Radio Deutsche Welle in Cologne, Germany, from 1966 to 1976, and was Africa Editor of National Zeitung, in Basel, Switzerland, becoming Editorial Director of New African magazine in London in 1978. In 1981, he launched a pan-African news magazine called Africa Now. He became Sole Administrator of Daily Times Nigeria Plc in 1996.
His "Peter Pan" column that he began writing in 1959 steered feathers among the political big-wings. Frank Barton in his book The Press of Africa (Macmillan Press Ltd.) described Enahhoro as "arguably Africa’s best journalist writing in the English language".

Self-exile 
In an interview with Anote Ajeluorou of the Vanguard Saturday Magazine, Enahoro acknowledged fleeing Nigeria, aged 31 in the 1960s. This was unconnected to the 1966 Civil War. He first returned in 1979 before leaving. Again, in 1990 he returned but was "unable to settle down".

Publication 
 How to be a Nigerian (1966)
 You Gotta Cry to Laugh (1972)
 The Complete Nigerian (1992)
 Then Spoke the Thunder (2009)

References

External links 
 Anote Ajeluorou, "Peter Enahoro: Reflections Of A Patriot", The Guardian (Nigeria), 6 February 2015

1935 births
Living people
Nigerian Africanists
Nigerian journalists